Nacional Futebol Clube, commonly referred to as Nacional, is a Brazilian professional club based in Manaus, Amazonas founded on 13 January 1913. It competes in the Campeonato Brasileiro Série D, the fourth tier of Brazilian football, as well as in the Campeonato Amazonense, the top flight of the Amazonas state football league.

History
On January 13, 1913, Nacional Futebol Clube was founded. The club was initially named Eleven Nacional.

On February 8, 1914, Nacional played the first Campeonato Amazonense match, against Manaós Sporting.

On July 8, 1930, Nacional Futebol Clube former members who were dissatisfied with the club founded Nacional Fast Clube.

In 1975, Nacional finished in Campeonato Brasileiro Série A's 16th position, ahead of clubs such as Vasco da Gama, Atlético Mineiro and Santos. In 1984, during a trip to Morocco, in North Africa, Nacional won the King of Morocco Cup, in Rabat.

In 1985, Nacional competed for the last time the Campeonato Brasileiro Série A. The club finished in the 18th position, ahead of clubs like Fluminense, Grêmio and São Paulo. The club competed in 1992 in Copa do Brasil for the first time, being eliminated by Vasco da Gama in the first round. The first leg, in Manaus, ended in a 1–1 draw. In the second leg, in Rio de Janeiro, Vasco beat Nacional 5–0.

Honours
 Campeonato Amazonense
 Winners (43): 1916, 1917, 1918, 1919, 1920, 1922, 1923, 1933, 1936, 1937, 1939, 1941, 1942, 1945, 1946, 1950, 1957, 1963, 1964, 1968, 1969, 1972, 1974, 1976, 1977, 1978, 1979, 1980, 1981, 1983, 1984, 1985, 1986, 1991, 1995, 1996, 2000, 2002, 2003, 2007, 2012, 2014, 2015
 Copa Amazonas
 Winners (1): 1999

Stadium

Nacional's home stadium is the Arena da Amazônia, opened in 2014, with a maximum capacity of 41,000 people. The stadium was built on the site of the old Vivaldao, which was demolished in order to construct a new stadium for the 2014 FIFA World Cup.

Only one training ground is owned by the club. Campo de Treinamento Barbosa Filho is located in Manaus.

Rivals
Nacional's biggest rivals are Rio Negro and São Raimundo (AM).

The derby against Rio Negro is called Rio-Nal, and is a traditional city derby, considered one of the biggest derbies of the city.

The derby against São Raimundo is the second biggest derby of the city, and it started due to the good performance of São Raimundo in recent years.

Symbols
The club's mascot is called Leão Azul, meaning "blue lion". Nacional is nicknamed Naça, which is the diminutive form of the name Nacional, Leão Azul (Blue Lion) and Time da Estrela Azul (Blue Star Team). The club colors are blue and white.

Ultra groups
 Torcida Organizadas do Nacional
 Torcida Organizada Leões da Amazônia
 Torcida Organizada Naça Gol
 Torcida Organizada Naçacanagem
 Torcida Organizada Narraça
 Torcida Organizada Selva Azul

References

External links
 
 Arquivo de Clubes

 
Association football clubs established in 1913
Football clubs in Amazonas (Brazilian state)
1913 establishments in Brazil